Plainfield Teachers College was an imaginary college, created as a hoax, that fooled The New York Times sports department and college football fans across the country.

The hoax
In 1941, stockbroker Morris Newburger and radio sales executive Alexander "Bink" Dannenbaum concocted the idea of a mythical college football team. Using the name Jerry Croyden, Newburger phoned the New York papers and Dannenbaum phoned the Philadelphia papers with fantastic stories of Plainfield's lopsided victories over several (equally nonexistent) schools, beginning in late October. For the first two weeks, the scores and the opponents in the New York and Philadelphia papers did not match but by the third week, they were better organized.

When the newspapers started printing the scores week after week, Newburger and Dannenbaum invented other details, including a sophomore running back named Johnny "The Celestial Comet" Chung, whose amazing abilities on the gridiron was chalked up to the rice he ate on the bench between quarters. Hop-Along Hobelitz was named as Plainfield's coach. There was even speculation that Plainfield might secure a bid to a small-college bowl game; in fact, Newburger had already planned for the team to "play" in the non-existent "Blackboard Bowl" in Atlantic City at season's end.

After several weeks of Plainfield victories (padded by "wins" Newburger made up after the fact), Red Smith from the Philadelphia Record (who by this time was also reporting the fake scores) decided to actually go to Plainfield, New Jersey, to try to find the college—and, of course, there wasn't one. (At the time, New Jersey had real teacher colleges in Jersey City, Newark, Paterson, Montclair, Glassboro, and Trenton, none of them fielding football teams as the student bodies were largely female.)

Finally, Newburger and Dannenbaum had to confess, and "Jerry Croyden" wrote his final press release, stating that Plainfield had cancelled its remaining schedule as Chung and several other players were declared ineligible after flunking exams. The Tribune took it in good humor, reporting the hoax; columnist Franklin Pierce Adams even wrote a song for Plainfield, to the tune of Cornell's "Far Above Cayuga's Waters": "Far above New Jersey's swamplands / Plainfield Teachers' spires! / Mark a phony, ghostly college / That got on the wires...!"

1941 "season"

All games and opponents are fictitious.

See also
Maguire University
H. Rochester Sneath
North Central College, founded as Plainfield College

References

External links
 "Plainfield State and Chung were Too Good To Be True", The Westfield Leader

Fictional American universities and colleges
Plainfield, New Jersey
Hoaxes in the United States
1940s hoaxes
1941 in the United States